Hannah Jane Fox (born 13 January 1976) is an English stage actress, best known for playing "Scaramouche" in the Queen jukebox musical We Will Rock You. She is an alumna of Mountview Academy of Theatre Arts.

Theatre

Television
Fox's best known role in television so far has been in Ben Elton's 2005 BBC sitcom Blessed, in which she played the character Vicky.  She has also appeared in two episodes of The Bill in 2007, as well as a few smaller roles in various TV programs. She then went on to star in another Ben Elton sitcom, The Wright Way. She later starred in the CBBC show, Millie Inbetween as Sharon, the mother of two.

References

External links
 Artist's website
 

1976 births
Alumni of the Mountview Academy of Theatre Arts
English musical theatre actresses
Living people